Live in Sydney is the 2001 DVD release of Kylie Minogue's On a Night Like This Tour. The DVD features exclusive backstage footage of the concert, including a look into the dancers dressing rooms and a prank played on Kylie during the show entitled 'Will Kylie Crack'. The DVD was certified 3× Platinum in Australia.

Track listing

Certifications

References

Kylie Minogue video albums
Live video albums
2001 video albums
Kylie Minogue live albums
2001 live albums